The Newton House Museum, also known as the Matthew Rainey House, is a historic house museum at 510 North Jackson Street in El Dorado, Arkansas, United States.  The house was built sometime between 1843 and 1853 by Matthew Rainey, El Dorado's first settler, and is the oldest building in the city.  It is a vernacular two-story wood-frame structure with a central hall and rooms on either side.  It stands at the edge of a  parcel, having been moved from its center in 1910.

The house was listed on the National Register of Historic Places in 1974, and included in the Murphy-Hill Historic District in 2007.  It is now owned by the South Arkansas Historical Foundation, which operates it as a museum.

See also
National Register of Historic Places listings in Union County, Arkansas

References

External links
Newton House Museum website

1852 establishments in Arkansas
Individually listed contributing properties to historic districts on the National Register in Arkansas
Historic house museums in Arkansas
Houses completed in 1852
Houses in Union County, Arkansas
Houses on the National Register of Historic Places in Arkansas
National Register of Historic Places in Union County, Arkansas
Museums in Union County, Arkansas